Obodai Sai (born 24 March 1984) is a Ghanaian professional boxer who held the Commonwealth super-welterweight title in 2011.

References

External links

Image - Obodai Sai

1984 births
Light-middleweight boxers
Living people
Middleweight boxers
Boxers from Accra
Ghanaian male boxers
Sai family